Wagnerite is a mineral, a combined phosphate and fluoride of iron and magnesium, with the formula .  It occurs in pegmatite associated with other phosphate minerals. It is named after Franz Michael von Wagner (1768–1851), a German mining official in Munich.

References

Bibliography
Palache, P.; Berman H.; Frondel, C. (1960). "Dana's System of Mineralogy, Volume II: Halides, Nitrates, Borates, Carbonates, Sulfates, Phosphates, Arsenates, Tungstates, Molybdates, Etc. (Seventh Edition)" John Wiley and Sons, Inc., New York, pp. 845-847.

Magnesium minerals
Iron(II) minerals
Phosphate minerals
Fluorine minerals
Monoclinic minerals
Minerals in space group 14